Makhand is a village in Chaybasar-e Jonubi Rural District, in the Central District of Maku County, West Azerbaijan Province, Iran. At the 2006 census, its population was 227, in 46 families.

Makhand is also a historical village in Taluka: Qazi Ahmed, District: Shaheed Benazeer Abad (SBA), 

 
 Sindh Pakistan'''

References 

Populated places in Maku County